The Atlas dwarf lizard (Atlantolacerta andreanskyi), commonly known  as Andreansky's lizard, is the only species in the genus Atlantolacerta, in the wall lizard family, Lacertidae. The species is indigenous to north-western Africa.

Etymology
The specific name, andreanskyi, is in honor of Hungarian botanist Gábor Andreánszky.

Geographic range

Ecology
Although A. andreanskyi is generally considered to be rare, animals are often well hidden in vegetation and may occur at higher densities than was first assumed. They can be very common in favourable conditions and are found in alpine meadows, scree, amongst boulders, and in areas of thorn cushion vegetation and thickets. They have long hibernation periods.

Reproduction
The females of A. andreanskyi lay three clutches of between one and three eggs per year.

Conservation status
A. andreanskyi does not appear to be threatened, but it does occur in readily accessible areas, most especially by hikers.

References

Further reading
Arnold EN, Arribas O, Carranza S (2007). "Systematics of the Palaearctic and Oriental lizard tribe Lacertini (Squamata: Lacertidae: Lacertinae), with descriptions of eight new genera". Zootaxa 1430: 1-86. (Atlantolacerta, new genus, p. 63).
Barata M, Perera A, Harris DJ (2015). "Cryptic variation in the Moroccan high altitude lizard Atlantolacerta andreanskyi (Squamata: Lacertidae)". African Journal of Herpetology 64 (1): 1–17.
Mayer W, Bischoff W (1996). "Beiträge zur taxonomischen Revision der Gattung Lacerta (Reptilia: Lacertidae) Teil 1: Zootoca, Omanosaura, Timon und Teira als eigenständige Gattungen ". Salamandra 32 (3): 163–170. (Teira andreanskyi, new combination, p. 169). (in German)
Werner F (1929). "Wissenschaftliche Ergebnisse einer zoologischen Forschungreise nach Westalgerien und Marokko ". Sitzungsberichte der Kaiserliche Akademie der Wissenschaften in Wien 138: 1-34. (Lacerta andreanskyi, new species, pp. 4–5). (in German).

Lacertidae
Endemic fauna of Morocco
Reptiles described in 1929
Taxa named by Franz Werner
Reptiles of North Africa
Taxonomy articles created by Polbot